Alfred Edward "Alf" Jackson was a New Zealand rugby league footballer who played in the 1900s and 1910s.

He represented the North Shore rugby league club and played for Auckland.

On 7 August 1909, Jackson played for Auckland against Taranaki. He played in the game for Auckland against the touring Lions in 1910. He was then part of the 1910 Auckland side that toured the country between 20 September and 13 October, playing matches in Wanganui, Bluff, Invercargill, Dunedin, Napier and Dannevirke.

Jackson played for New Zealand during the 1913 New Zealand rugby league tour of Australia, a tour where no test matches were played.

References 

New Zealand national rugby league team players
New Zealand rugby league players
Auckland rugby league team players
Year of birth missing
Year of death missing
North Shore Albions players
Rugby league halfbacks
Rugby league five-eighths